Julie St. Claire (born Juliette Marie Capone; June 10, 1970), is an American actress, director and producer.

Early life
St. Claire was born in Geneva, New York, but moved to California with her family in 1979. She competed in the U.S. Gymnastic Federation as a child, and also showed horses (both Western and English).

Career
In 1982 she debuted on the NBC television series Silver Spoons, portraying Ricky Schroder's girlfriend, which led to numerous guest appearances and film roles, including Sid & Nancy (1986). The Southern California Motion Picture Council awarded her the Bronze Halo in 1983 for Best Up & Coming Young Actress; she also received a nomination for the Young Artist Award.

Her first regular television role came on Personal & Confidential. Following high school, after a year of attending the American Academy of Dramatic Arts (West) in Pasadena on a scholarship, in 1990 she starred as Tawny Richards on the soap opera series Santa Barbara. In 1987 she was nominated for "Exceptional Performance by a Young Actress, Guest Starring in a Television, Comedy or Drama Series" for a 1986 appearance on The Judge.

Later work
After Santa Barbara and along with many more film and television roles, St. Claire went on to star as Maria in UPN's A.J.'s Time Travelers and portrayed Marla Antoni on Lincoln Heights.

Personal details
St. Claire lives in California with her husband and their son. She is a member of the Hollywood Knights celebrity basketball team hall of fame and has been credited as "Julie Capone". She attended AADA West in Pasadena, California.

See also
 Lima: Breaking the Silence (1999 film)

References

External links

1970 births
Actresses from New York (state)
American film actresses
Film producers from New York (state)
American soap opera actresses
American television actresses
Living people
People from Geneva, New York
Film directors from New York (state)
American women film producers
21st-century American women